Duke Field , also known as Eglin AFB Auxiliary Field #3, is a military airport located three miles (5 km) south of the central business district of Crestview, in Okaloosa County, Florida, United States.

History 
Duke Field was one of the first auxiliary fields built on the Eglin Field / Eglin AFB complex. Clearing and grading began 23 January 1941, with the first building foundations laid on 15 February 1942.  Field 3 was used as a training base by the Doolittle Raiders in 1942. Shortly after the end of World War II, the field was one of several sites used in the production of the 1949 feature film Twelve O'Clock High.

Cold War
In the 1950s, Duke Field became home to the 3205th Drone Group, which operated radio remote-controlled B-17s and F-80s that were used for gunnery and missile practice over the Gulf of Mexico. They were also used in the nuclear test program by flying the unmanned aircraft through atomic detonation clouds to gather fallout information.

A large hump-backed steel hangar, the "Butler Hangar",  X 130 feet, transported from Trinidad (probably from the former Waller Air Force Base, closed 28 May 1949 due to budget cuts), was erected at Auxiliary Field 3 between 1 April and ~10 July 1950, by personnel of Company 'C', 806th Aviation Engineering Battalion, under Captain Samuel M. Cable, and the men of the 550th Guided Missiles Wing. Project Officer was Captain Clarence A. Ebbert of the Proving Ground Command Installations Division. An additional four feet of roof clearance was added to accommodate B-17s in the  structure. Concrete block buildings,  X 40 feet, were erected on the flanks of the hangar. The new ramps and runway expansion consisted of asphalt over a crushed shell base.

In 1960 and 1961, in preparation for the Bay of Pigs Invasion, Duke Field was host to 'sanitized' Douglas C-54s and Curtiss C-46s used for transporting personnel, armaments and supplies between US bases such as Homestead AFB and Opa-locka Airport and CIA-run bases in Guatemala and latterly Nicaragua. A unit at the field was responsible for 'sanitizing' and adapting about 20 Douglas B-26 Invaders for use by Cuban exile aircrews during the invasion. A few T-33s and C-130s were also prepared for use in the conflict, but not used.

The Development Projects Division (DPD), the Central Intelligence Agency's air arm, operated as the 1045th Operational Evaluation and Training Group, Headquarters Command, Eglin AFB, as the Air Force designated it, but which was a DPD operation out of Duke Field from late 1960 to June/July 1961. "There was a total of about 20 Polish airmen at Eglin at the time, all of them 'employed' by Lockheed, so there should be enough of them to form at least two crews." The DPD operated independently of "the organizational structure of the project, in which it had a vital, central role, including air drops to the underground, training Cuban pilots, operation of air bases, the immense logistical problems of transporting the Cuban volunteers from Florida to Guatemala, and the procuring and servicing of the military planes."

Special Operations use
Between August and October 1970, during the Vietnam War, the Joint Contingency Task Group used AFROTC facilities at Duke Field to house US Army Special Forces troops involved in Operation Ivory Coast, a mission to rescue prisoners of war at Sơn Tây, North Vietnam. Aircraft based at Eglin AFB and Hurlburt Field involved in the training also used Duke Field daily as an operational airstrip to maintain a low profile.

On 30 July 1971, the 919th Tactical Airlift Group (919 TAG) was activated in the Air Force Reserve (AFRES) and established at Duke Field with C-130A Hercules aircraft, with the unit operationally gained by the Tactical Air Command (TAC).  With this action, the 919 TAG effectively became the "host group" organization (similar to "host wing" at larger USAF installations) for Duke Field.

On 1 July 1975 the 919 TAG converted to a special operations mission and became the 919th Special Operations Group (919 SOG), the only Air Force Reserve AC-130 Spectre gunship unit.  AC-130A were transferred from the Regular Air Force as the Regular Air Force transitioned to the AC-130H and nearly $6.7 million in new construction was programmed at Duke Field through Fiscal Year 1976.  Although USAF C-130 airlift units were transferred to the Military Airlift Command (MAC) in 1975, AC-130 units remained under TAC.

In 1980, Duke Field was also one of the fields used in training for Operation Credible Sport, an initiative to prepare for a second rescue attempt of American hostages held in Iran using C-130 aircraft modified with multiple rocket engines for extremely short landings and takeoffs. Most of the testing for this was done at Wagner Field (Eglin AFB Auxiliary Field #1) and it was there during a 29 October 1980 demonstration of one of the highly modified YMC-130H Credible Sport aircraft that a malfunction and hard landing resulted in the destruction of this particular aircraft.  All crew aboard the aircraft survived.

In 1983, operational claimancy for the 919 SOG shifted from TAC to MAC and the latter's newly established 23d Air Force (23 AF), said action paralleling the transfer of all Regular Air Force AC-130 and MC-130 units and assets from TAC to MAC.  In 1990, 23 AF was re-designated as Air Force Special Operations Command (AFSOC), a separate Air Force major command (MAJCOM), and operational claimancy for the 919 SOG shifted to AFSOC.

In 1992, the 919 SOG was re-designated as the 919th Special Operations Wing (919 SOW), the designation it currently retains today.  In 1995, the 919 SOW's AC-130A aircraft were retired and the 919 SOW converted to the MC-130E Combat Talon I and MC-130P Combat Shadow aircraft and made available for worldwide deployment.  Also in 1995, while the wing's 711th Special Operations Squadron (711 SOS) transitioned to the MC-130E, the 5th Special Operations Squadron (5 SOS) was activated within the 919 SOW at Duke Field to fly the MC-130N/P, Combat Shadow special operations aerial refueling aircraft.

On 17 February 1997, the Air Force Reserve (AFRES) ceased to be a Field Operating Agency of the Air Force and became an Air Force MAJCOM as the Air Force Reserve Command (AFRC), making the 919 SOW a subordinate command of AFRC.  However, the 919 SOW's operational relationship with AFSOC would remain unchanged.

In 2000, about 170 active duty USAF aircraft maintenance personnel from the 716th Maintenance Squadron (716 MXS) took up residence at Duke Field as an Active Associate unit to the 919 SOW.  At the time, this symbiotic relationship was unique because it was the only active associate maintenance squadron in the Air Force. The 716 MXS worked in tandem with Air Force Reserve members to provide maintenance support to MC-130E aircraft. The 716 MXS maintainers were under the mission control of the 919th Maintenance Group (919 MXG) infrastructure and 919 MXG work center supervisors scheduled the maintainers, prioritized the work, furnished tools and special equipment, and provided first line supervision. However, the 716 MXS maintainers remained under the administrative control of the active duty 16th Maintenance Group (16 MXG) at Hurlburt Field through the 716 MXS commander. The commander was responsible for military discipline matters, administrative reports (including performance reports), personnel accountability, manpower, training, individual equipment and temporary duty/travel funding.

2008 Doolittle reunion
Six original Raiders were present at Duke Field, on Saturday 31 May 2008 for the culmination of their annual reunion. Three civilian B-25s in warbird markings re-enacted the training take-off sessions, with personnel from NAS Pensacola as flight deck crew representing that service's contribution to the Tokyo raid.

The 919 SOW retired its fleet of C-145A Combat Coyote in December 2022.

Role and operations
Although technically part of the larger nearby Eglin Air Force Base complex, today Duke Field is essentially a small air force base in its own right.  Primarily an AFRC installation, Duke Field is hosted by the 919th Special Operations Wing (919 SOW), which operated the MC-130E Combat Talon I aircraft until April 2013  The 919 SOW previously operated the AC-130A Spectre gunship aircraft as flown by the 711 SOS prior to transitioning to the MC-130E in 1995.

The 919 SOW currently operates the MQ-9 Reaper, U-28A Draco and C-146A Wolfhound aircraft.  As an AFRC unit, the 919 SOW is operationally gained by AFSOC, headquartered at nearby Hurlburt Field.   The wing contains 13 squadrons, 2 of which are stationed at Hurlburt Field, Florida.

Based units 
Flying and notable non-flying units based at Duke Field.

Units marked GSU are Geographically Separate Units, which although based at Duke, are subordinate to a parent unit based at another location.

United States Air Force 

Air Force Reserve Command (AFRC)
 Tenth Air Force 
 919th Special Operations Wing (Host)
 919th Special Operations Group
 311th Special Operations Intelligence Squadron
 711th Special Operations Squadron
 859th Special Operations Squadron – Non-Standard Aviation (NSAV) mission 
 919th Special Operations Support Squadron 
 919th Special Operations Maintenance Group 
 919th Special Operations Maintenance Squadron
 919th Special Operations Aircraft Maintenance Squadron
 919th Maintenance Operations Flight 
 919th Special Operations Medical Squadron
 919th Special Operations Mission Support Group
 919th Special Operations Civil Engineer Squadron
 919th Special Operations Security Forces Squadron
 919th Special Operations Communications Squadron
 919th Special Operations Logistics Readiness Squadron
 919th Special Operations Force Support Squadron

Air Force Special Operations Command (AFSOC)

 492d Special Operations Wing
 6th Special Operations Squadron (GSU)
 524th Special Operations Squadron (GSU) – C-146A Wolfhound

Air Force Materiel Command (AFMC)

 Air Force Test Center 
 96th Test Wing
 96th Operations Group
 413th Flight Test Squadron (GSU) – CV-22 Osprey, HH-60W Pave Hawk, UH-1N Iroquois 
 Detachment 1 (GSU) – AC-130J Ghostrider, C-130 Hercules, HC-130J Combat King II, MC-130J Commando II

Air Force Global Strike Command (AFGSC)
 Detachment 7 – MH-139A Grey Wolf

Infrastructure and facilities 

The installation is named for 1st Lt Robert L. Duke, who died in the crash of a Curtiss A-25A-20-CS Shrike, AAF Ser. No. 42-79823, near Spencer, Tennessee  on 29 December 1943. He was assigned as Assistant A-3 to the Proving Ground of the AAF Proving Ground Command at Eglin Field, Florida, now Eglin Air Force Base.

Duke Field has two asphalt paved runways: Runway 18/36, measuring 8,025 x 150 ft (2,446 x 46 m) and Assault Runway 180/360, measuring 3,500 x 60 ft (1,067 x 18 m).

Although technically an auxiliary field to Eglin AFB, Duke Field is essentially a self-contained installation.  The airfield has its own air traffic control tower, security forces building, Air Force Fire Protection facilities (Fire Station #8), instrument landing system (ILS), TACAN and support infrastructure such as a large flight line/ramp area, hangars, shoppette, self service gas station, hotel service, fitness track, recreational areas, maintenance facilities and other operational and administrative support buildings.

See also

 Florida World War II Army Airfields

References

External links
 Duke Field at GlobalSecurity.org
 
 
 

Fields of the United States Air Force
Airfields of the United States Army Air Forces in Florida
Airports in Florida
Transportation buildings and structures in Okaloosa County, Florida
1942 establishments in Florida